The Harvard Asia Pacific Review is a biannual academic journal covering the Asia-Pacific Region and edited by students at Harvard University. The journal solicits contributions from scholars, politicians, businessmen and cultural figures in and about the Asia-Pacific region. It was established in 1996.

External links
 

Harvard University academic journals
Asian studies journals
International relations journals
Publications established in 1996
English-language journals
Biannual journals
Oceania studies journals
Academic journals edited by students